Abdera is a genus of false darkling beetles, in the family Melandryidae. It contains three species, two of which are extinct and were discovered in 2014.

Species

References

Tenebrionoidea genera
Melandryidae
Taxa described in 1832